The Phoenix flood of 1891 was the largest recorded flood of the Salt River, occurring from February 19 to February 26. It affected most of the Salt River Valley in Maricopa County, Arizona and caused damaged to the cities of Phoenix, Tempe, and Mesa. The river swelled to over 3 miles wide and caused significant damage, including the destruction of a railroad bridge. The flood was a major precursor to the formation of the Salt River Project.

References

Events in Phoenix, Arizona
February 1891 events
Events in Maricopa County, Arizona
Floods in the United States
Natural disasters in Arizona
1891 in Arizona Territory